Footloose is a fictional character from the G.I. Joe: A Real American Hero toyline, comic books and animated series. He is the G.I. Joe Team's infantry trooper, and debuted in 1985.

Profile
His real name is Andrew D. Meyers, and his rank is that of corporal E-4. Footloose was born in Gary, Indiana. Footloose wears a jungle camouflage pattern in his uniform and is equipped with a PASGT helmet with additional camo over it.

Footloose's primary military specialty is infantry, and his secondary military specialty is special services (basketball coach). He was his high school valedictorian, captain of the track team, and an Eagle scout. While going for his degree in Physical Education on a state scholarship, he suddenly dropped out and moved to the coast for about three years. He spent time there pondering the pointlessness of his existence, when he decided to join the Army. After basic training and AIT at Fort Benning, he graduated jump school and the desert training unit. Footloose is a qualified expert in all NATO and Warsaw Pact small arms.

In the UK Action Force toy series, Footloose's real name is Andrew D. Mackay, and he is from Dundee, Scotland, where he competed in the Highland Games and studied Celtic mythology.

Toys
Footloose was first released as an action figure in 1985. Proposed code-names for the figure included "Action", "Bravo" and "Grunt". The figure was repainted and released as part of the "Slaughter's Marauders" line in 1989.

Comics

Marvel Comics
In the Marvel Comics G.I. Joe series, he first appeared in G.I. Joe: A Real American Hero #37 (July 1985). In that issue, despite his known inexperience, he is assigned to drive a small tank as backup to Flint. They are backup for the group of Blowtorch, Ripcord, Gung-Ho and Ripcord's girlfriend, Candy Appel. Said group had been attacked at the circus by the Crimson Twins. All the Joes become involved in a running battle throughout the grounds. He is then back-up for a raid on a suspected Cobra officer's house; coincidentally it is the home of Candy Appel's father.

Footloose also takes part in the invasion of the Cobra-held town of Springfield.

Action Force
Footloose also appeared in the U.K. Action Force comic series, which had all original England based stories starring familiar Joe characters. In the first issue, Footloose is described as "one of our best field agents". Following, a Cobra underwater soldier Footloose had captured in the first issue is seen standing over his prone body with a knife. However, Footloose helps raid a Cobra outpost soon after. He then assists in stopping a Crimson Guard plan to blow up the Eiffel Tower. Another Crimson Guard, at a later time, ends up holding a classroom of his own students hostage. Footloose is one of the many authorities on the scene; ready to drop the man with a sniper rifle. He is not needed as of the Guard's own students talks the man into surrendering.

Devil's Due
Footloose takes part in the three battle between the Joes, Cobra, and the Coil.

During the World War III storyline in America's Elite, Footloose is among the Joes deployed to Bolivia.

Animated series

Sunbow
Footloose first appeared in the Sunbow/Marvel G.I. Joe miniseries "The Pyramid of Darkness". In this series, his personality is portrayed as usually in a zen state of mind, and one which is frequently out of touch with reality. 

He is featured in the episode "Excalibur", in which he is one of the Joes setting up an anti-Cobra radar system in Britain. When Storm Shadow infiltrates the area, Footloose, Quick Kick and Spirit pursue him. Footloose is captured by Storm Shadow, but is later rescued by Quick Kick.

Footloose's most notable role was in "Hearts and Cannons". The episode begins with him and Dusty jumping out of a damaged G.I. Joe cargo plane, along with their Mauler tank. They find themselves in a desert, where Cobra is testing their new Plasma Cannon weapon. They rescue Dr. Nancy Winters, a beautiful scientist who was tricked into designing the Plasma Cannon for Destro, and compete for her affection. Walking through a dust storm, Footloose escapes with Dr. Winters as he is ordered by Dusty, who fends off Cobra forces. Footloose and Dr. Winters are captured by King Ahmed Razouli Jabal, who initially mistakes them for Cobra members, but releases them when he recognizes the G.I. Joe logo on Footloose's uniform. The king gives Footloose the Mauler that was ejected earlier, and Footloose joins him in liberating his country from Cobra. Footloose eventually destroys Destro's plasma tank with the Mauler.

Footloose is featured in one of the series' PSAs, in which he teaches a child how to stop a nosebleed.

G.I. Joe: The Movie
Footloose appeared briefly in the 1987 animated film G.I. Joe: The Movie, with no speaking role.

DiC
He appeared again in the DiC-produced G.I. Joe animated series. He only appeared in the "Operation Dragonfire" miniseries, again with a silent role.

References

External links
 Footloose at JMM's G.I. Joe Comics Home Page

Comics characters introduced in 1985
Fictional characters from Indiana
Fictional corporals
Fictional military sergeants
Fictional United States Army personnel
G.I. Joe soldiers
Male characters in animated series
Male characters in comics